Heliophanus kovacsi is a jumping spider species in the genus Heliophanus.  It was first described by Wanda Wesołowska in 2003 in Ethiopia.

References

Endemic fauna of Ethiopia
Salticidae
Fauna of Ethiopia
Spiders of Africa
Spiders described in 2003
Taxa named by Wanda Wesołowska